Ciboušov is a small settlement near Klášterec nad Ohří (and is officially part of that town), Czech Republic.

The first recorded mention of Ciboušov dates back to 1367. At that time, the little village was subordinate to the castle of Hasištejn. Since then, it has often changed owners. Šumburks, Fictums and then was added to other villages or towns as their part (Miřetice, Rašovice, Klášterec). The population has been decreasing since the 19th century—from 99 in 1863 to just 29 in 1991.

Populated places in Chomutov District
Neighbourhoods in the Czech Republic